Madisonville is an unincorporated community in Madison Township in Lackawanna County, Pennsylvania. Madisonville is located at the intersection of Pennsylvania Route 690 and Reservoir Road, northeast of Moscow.

References

Unincorporated communities in Lackawanna County, Pennsylvania
Unincorporated communities in Pennsylvania